Gilbert East (1763–1865) was an English cricketer of the late 18th century who played mainly for Berkshire and the White Conduit Club.  He was one of the leading amateur players of his time and was a good all-rounder.

Gilbert East made 13 known first-class appearances between 1785 and 1794.

He is buried at Hurley, Berkshire with a monument by James Sherwood Westmacott.

References 

English cricketers
Berkshire cricketers
English cricketers of 1701 to 1786
1763 births
Year of death missing
White Conduit Club cricketers
English cricketers of 1787 to 1825
Marylebone Cricket Club cricketers